The women's 50 metre backstroke competition of the swimming events at the 2011 World Aquatics Championships took place on July 27 with the heats and the semifinals and July 28 with the final.

Records
Prior to the competition, the existing world and championship records were as follows.

Results

Heats
57 swimmers participated in 8 heats.

Semifinals
The semifinals were held at 18:13.

Semifinal 1

Semifinal 2

Final
The final was held at 19:17.

References

External links
2011 World Aquatics Championships: Women's 50 metre backstroke start list, from OmegaTiming.com; retrieved 2011-07-23.

Backstroke 050 metre, women's
World Aquatics Championships
2011 in women's swimming